Zoltán Szilágyi (born June 21, 1967 in Budapest) is a former freestyle swimmer from Hungary, who competed in the 1988, 1992, 2000 Summer Olympics. His daughter, Liliána Szilágyi is also a professional swimmer, specializing in butterfly events. In December 2021, his daughter accused him of abusing her mentally, physically and sexually since she was a young child. In a subsequent statement, he denied the accusations, and threatened to sue his daughter. The Hungarian Swimming Association also released a statement and promised to launch an investigation into the matter.

References

External links
 

1967 births
Living people
Hungarian male swimmers
Olympic swimmers of Hungary
Hungarian male freestyle swimmers
Swimmers at the 1988 Summer Olympics
Swimmers at the 1992 Summer Olympics
Swimmers at the 2000 Summer Olympics
Swimmers from Budapest